Atlético San Francisco, (simply known as Brujos) is a Mexican professional football club. The club plays in the Serie B de México and is based in San Francisco del Rincón, Guanajuato, México. It was established in 1966 and it has never played in the Primera División Profesional.

History
Atlético San Francisco was founded in 1966 and in that same year the club join the Segunda División. The club has never being able to play in the Primera División.
In 1994, the club played in the inaugural season of the new second-tier Primera División A. In 1999, the club was relegated back to the Segunda División. Between 1999 and 2005 San Francisco played in Segunda División. The club ever since has been again relegated to the Tercera División de México and has played there between 2005 and 2019. On June 8, 2019, Atlético San Francisco defeated Aguacateros C.D.U. Uruapan in the semifinal of the 2018-19 season with this result the team won one of the two promotion place for the Liga Premier de México (former Segunda División).

Club honours 
Tercera División de México: 1
1991-1992

Players

Current squad

References

External links
Official Website 

Football clubs in Guanajuato
Association football clubs established in 1966
1966 establishments in Mexico
Ascenso MX teams